Daphnia occidentalis is a species of crustacean in the family Daphniidae. It is endemic to Australia, and is the only species in the subgenus Australodaphnia.

References

Cladocera
Vulnerable fauna of Australia
Freshwater crustaceans of Australia
Taxonomy articles created by Polbot
Crustaceans described in 1986